This page summarises the Champions Path matches of the 2022–23 UEFA Europa Conference League qualifying phase and play-off round.

Times are CEST (UTC+2), as listed by UEFA (local times, if different, are in parentheses).

Second qualifying round

Summary

|+Champions Path

|}

Matches

Ballkani won 10–0 on aggregate.

Víkingur Reykjavík won 2–0 on aggregate.

KÍ Klaksvík won 1–0 on aggregate.

Hibernians won 4–3 on aggregate.

Zrinjski Mostar won 4–2 on aggregate.

Lech Poznań won 6–1 on aggregate.

CFR Cluj won 4–1 on aggregate.

Tobol won 3–0 on aggregate.

Third qualifying round

Summary

|+Champions Path

|}

Matches

Lech Poznań won 4–2 on aggregate.

RFS won 4–2 on aggregate.

4–4 on aggregate. Ballkani won 4–3 on penalties.

Zrinjski Mostar won 2–1 on aggregate.

CFR Cluj won 1–0 on aggregate.

Play-off round

Summary

|+Champions Path

|}

Matches

CFR Cluj won 1–0 on aggregate.

3–3 on aggregate. RFS won 4–2 on penalties.

Lech Poznań won 3–1 on aggregate.

Ballkani won 3–1 on aggregate.

2–2 on aggregate. Slovan Bratislava won 6–5 on penalties.

Notes

References

External links

1M